The Chinese Ambassador to Chad is the official representative of the People's Republic of China to Chad.

List of representatives

Republic of China (1962–1972)

People's Republic of China (1973–1997)

Republic of China (1997–2006)

People's Republic of China (2006–present)

See also
China–Chad relations

References 

Chad
Ambassadors